Christopher Gabriel Nelson is an American rock musician from Sacramento, California, best known as the former bassist of the alternative rock band CAKE. Nelson replaced the original bassist, Shon Meckfessel, soon after the band was formed but left the band himself before the release of their first album, Motorcade of Generosity, which lists Victor Damiani as bassist. After the release of CAKE's second album, Fashion Nugget, Damiani left and Nelson re-joined. After playing bass and helping co-write songs on CAKE's subsequent studio albums, Nelson left the band again in late 2015.

Nelson is lead vocalist and songwriter for the group Bellygunner along with his wife Peggy Lanza and musicians Thomas Monson, Steve Randall and Shawn Hale. In addition to performing with artists such as Greg Loiacono and the band The Mother Hips, Nelson offers private music lessons to students in the Sacramento area.

Selected discography
Prolonging the Magic, 1998
Comfort Eagle, 2001
Pressure Chief, 2004
Showroom of Compassion, 2011

References

External links
 Official Bellygunner Facebook
 Official Bellygunner Youtube

Living people
American male singer-songwriters
American rock singers
American rock songwriters
American rock guitarists
American male guitarists
Singer-songwriters from California
Cake (band) members
Guitarists from California
1967 births